The D'Amore-McKim School of Business is the business school of Northeastern University in Boston, Massachusetts. The business program was founded in 1922, followed by the Graduate School of Business Administration in 1952. The Master of Business Administration (MBA) program was ranked 83rd globally by Economist Magazine and received 4 Palmes accolades by Eduniversal in 2018. Its Online MBA program was ranked 12th in the world in 2018 by the Financial Times

Northeastern University's signature cooperative education, or co-op, program, which allows students to alternative semesters of study and full-time professional experience, works with more than 3,000 employers in nearly 50 countries around the world.

The D'Amore-McKim School boasts more than 50,000 living alumni, including graduates from both the graduate and undergraduate programs. They live in 137 countries around the world.

History

The D'Amore-McKim School of Business can trace its history back to the earliest days of Northeastern's existence, when commerce and industry courses were offered in 1907 by the School of Commerce and Finance of the Boston Young Men's Christian Association (YMCA). The fundamental aim of the school was to provide students with courses in commerce, accounting and finance in preparation for business positions. During that first year, 25 courses were offered, 18 instructors were hired and 208 students enrolled. Through evening study, B.C.S. and M.C.S degrees were eventually offered. After years of consideration, a School of Business Administration opened in September 1922, offering courses in general business, industrial management, marketing, finance and accounting. The first two years of the four-year program were devoted to learning sound business principles and the last two years were dedicated to specialization leading to definite marketable skills. The first MBA program was launched in 1951 as part of an Evening Division, and in 1958 the program became part of the Graduate School. 

The business school is housed in Dodge Hall on Krentzman Quadrangle off Huntington Avenue in Boston. Constructed in 1952, it was named for Robert Gray Dodge, chairman of Northeastern's Board of Trustees from 1936 to 1959. The basement of the five-story building once housed the university's main library, from 1952 until 1990, when Snell Library opened.

Naming donation
On September 12, 2012, Northeastern University announced a $60 million gift by alumni Richard D'Amore and Alan McKim, as "the largest philanthropic investment in the university's history...[and] the fourth-largest gift to name a business school in the United States." As a result of the gift, Northeastern's College of Business Administration was renamed the D'Amore-McKim School of Business. It was the first college or school to be named at Northeastern.

Academics
In the fall 2019, the D'Amore-McKim School had 5,583 total students, including 4,292 undergraduate students and 1,291 graduate students. Nearly 30 percent of students hail from more than 100 countries outside of the U.S. more countries other than the United States. 

The school reports that 99 percent of undergraduate students completed at least one co-op placement, including 49 percent who completed two co-op experiences and 34 percent who completed three experiences. Nearly 91 percent of undergraduates completed degree requirements in 6 years or less, after taking advantage of the co-op program. It also reports that 100 percent of graduate students in the full-time MBA program completed at least one corporate residency placement at a leading company or startup and that 100 percent of graduate students in the Master of Science (MS) in Accounting/MBA program completed a corporate residency placement at one of the Big Four or Global Five accounting firms.

The D'Amore-McKim School's undergraduate programs offers BSBA and BSIB degrees and the graduate school offers MS and MBA degrees.  Master of Science degrees are offered in Accounting, Taxation, Finance, International Business, and Technological Entrepreneurship.  The school also offers several certificates including Advanced Study in Management, Supply Chain Management, and Technological Entrepreneurship. The D'Amore-McKim School of Business is accredited by the Association to Advance Collegiate Schools of Business (AACSB).

MBA Programs

The full-time MBA is a 60-credit program that can be completed in 24 months of full-time study, including a six-month paid corporate residency. In addition to building a strong foundation of business knowledge, students can gain practical experience by participating in a corporate residency, specializing in a career track, and completing a business plan project for a corporate partner. The curriculum also has a globalization requirement which is fulfilled through the Global Projects Course, an international consulting project. Students complete a required course curriculum in their first year followed by an elective based curriculum determined by their chosen career track in their second year. Career tracks include Finance, Marketing, and Operations & Supply Chain Management.  The finance career track is further subdivided into Investments and Corporate Finance sub-tracks.

Northeastern's Evening MBA is a flexible, part-time program that allows students to complete the degree on their own timetable, set their own schedule, and specialize in an area that meets their career objectives. While selecting a specialization is not required, students can specialize in up to two of ten possible specializations.

Evening MBA Specializations
 Corporate Finance
 Entrepreneurship
 Supply Chain Management
 International Business
 Investments
 Marketing
 Corporate Renewal
 Mutual Fund Management
 Technological Entrepreneurship
 Health Care

The school also offers High Tech MBA, Online MBA, Online MSF, Online MST and Executive MBA programs.  In addition to their MBA and MS programs, Northeastern offers dual degrees combining the MBA degree with an MS or JD.  Dual degree programs include MS Finance/MBA, MS Accounting/MBA, MS Nursing/MBA, and JD/MBA.  The MS Finance/MBA and MS Accounting/MBA are obtained solely through the D'Amore-McKim School of Business, while the MS Nursing/MBA and the JD/MBA are obtained jointly through the School of Nursing and School of Law, respectively.

Rankings
In 2013, the undergraduate business school ranked 25th in the nation according to Business Week and in 2014 it ranked 19th. Northeastern also ranked No. 4 in Forbes magazine as one of "America's Most Entrepreneurial Campuses." The EMBA program is ranked in the top 50 in the U.S. by the Financial Times and No. 21 in the nation by US News. The Finance Department is ranked No. 2 in the nation by Advances in Financial Education in terms of the number of publications in financial journals. In addition, undergraduate students have dominated case competitions against other Boston area business schools, winning nine of the last 11 Business School Beanpot competitions. The full-time MBA program was ranked #51 in the 2012 Bloomberg Businessweek report. The program moved up five places since the last report published in 2010. Employer surveys have moved the Program from #57 to #48 nationally.

The 360 Huntington Fund
The 360 Huntington Fund is a unique portion of Northeastern University's endowment managed directly by graduate business students. Northeastern is internationally known for its emphasis on experiential learning, which the university believes produces professionals better prepared to tackle real-world challenges. Finance is no exception. The first objective of the 360 Huntington Fund is to educate students by tasking them with real and serious capital allocation responsibility that fosters their development into knowledgeable, experienced analysts by graduation. The second objective is to add value to Northeastern University's endowment through investment choices that are likely to produce long term growth. The 360 Huntington Fund's prospectus details this investment strategy.

International Field Study Programs
Northeastern's MBA international summer programs are designed to give students knowledge in and new perspectives regarding international business. They aim to help students develop critical skills necessary to compete and succeed in the global market. All courses involve a multinational faculty and are taught in English. Each year students can apply to their choice of one of four destinations offered. 2013 program offerings included China, Russia, South America (Peru & Chile), and the Aegean Region (Turkey & Greece).  In the past students have also gone to Brazil, Argentina, and India. The 2013 China IFS program visits through Hong Kong, Shanghai, and Beijing. The 2013 Russia IFS program visits Moscow and St. Petersburg. The 2013 South American IFS visits Lima, Peru and Santiago, Chile.  The 2013 Aegean Region IFS will visit Istanbul, Turkey and Athens, Greece.

References

Northeastern University
Business schools in Massachusetts
Educational institutions established in 1922
Universities and colleges in Boston
The Washington Campus
University subdivisions in Massachusetts
1922 establishments in Massachusetts